Wagneau Eloi (born 11 September 1973) is a Haitian former professional footballer who played as a striker.

Born in Haiti, Eloi's family relocated to Paris, France when he was nine. In Paris, Eloi played for Red Star and Paris FC before joining RC Lens where he made his senior debut. Having spent two seasons at AS Nancy he returned to Lens in 1997 helping the club win its first Ligue 1 title. In three years at AS Monaco he won another league title. He played the 2002–03 season at EA Guingamp and signed for Lens a third time in 2004. He retired from playing after two stints in Belgium with La Louvière and Roeselaere.

In 2008 Eloi became head coach of the Haiti national team.

In 2014 Eloi co-founded the US Champions Soccer Academy and became its technical director. He also became head of coach of FC Miami City Champions in the Premier Development League expansion franchise in the Miami, Florida metro.

Playing career
Born in Port-au-Prince, Haiti, Eloi's father was a carpenter and his mother a seamstress. He moved to France with his mother, his brother and his sister when he was nine years old. He spent four years at Paris-based club Red Star.

Eloi continued his training at Paris FC. He stayed two years at the club, being fielded as a goalkeeper in his first season, before joining RC Lens in 1991. At Lens, teammate Roger Boli became his mentor and friend. After four years at Lens he joined AS Nancy.

Under Roger Lemerre he won hist first professional championship title at the Military World Championships with the French team Joinville Battalion.

He returned to RC Lens where he helped the club win its first Ligue 1 title during the 1997–98 season.

In 1999, Eloi moved to AS Monaco FC, after Thierry Henry had left.

He joined the En Avant de Guingamp in 2002.

He trialled with US Créteil in January 2004 but ultimately rejoined RC Lens for a third time.

In 2008, his professional career came to an end in Belgium where he had played for both Roeselaere and La Louvière.

Post-playing career
Upon his retirement, Eloi returned to his native country, Haiti, in 2008. On 8 April 2008, he was unveiled as new head coach of Haiti national team in order to prepare it for the upcoming 2010 World Cup. In his first match, a 0–0 draw against the Netherlands Antilles, he fielded a young team with an age average of less than 24 years.

In 2014 Eloi co-founded the US Champions Soccer Academy with Ravy Truchot and Éric Rabésandratana and became its technical director. He was also made head coach of FC Miami City Champions, a new Premier Development League expansion franchise in the Miami, Florida metro.

Personal life
Eloi married a woman from Senegal. During his time at Guingamp, it was reported he enjoyed reading comics and manga.

Honours
Lens
Ligue 1: 1997–98

Monaco
Ligue 1: 1999–2000
Trophée des Champions: 2000

References

External links
 
 
 
 

1973 births
Haitian footballers
Living people
Association football forwards
Ligue 1 players
Belgian Pro League players
RC Lens players
AS Nancy Lorraine players
AS Monaco FC players
French footballers
French sportspeople of Haitian descent
En Avant Guingamp players
R.A.A. Louviéroise players
K.S.V. Roeselare players
Haitian football managers
Haiti international footballers
Haitian expatriate footballers
Expatriate footballers in France
Haitian expatriate sportspeople in France
Expatriate footballers in Belgium
Haitian expatriate sportspeople in Belgium
Expatriate footballers in Turkey
Haitian expatriate sportspeople in Turkey
Haitian expatriate sportspeople in Monaco